Rule 34 is an internet meme that states "If it exists, there is porn of it. No exceptions."

Rule 34 may also refer to:
 Rule 34 (novel), a novel by Charles Stross
 Rule 34 of the Federal Rules of Civil Procedure, which governs requests for production of documents
 Rule 34, the Wolfram code for a particular elementary cellular automaton
 Rule 34 (film), a 2022 drama directed by Julia Murat and starring Sol Miranda

See also
 The 34th Rule, a 1999 Star Trek: Deep Space Nine novel